Mohammad Taqi Kandi (also Romanized as Moḩammad Taqī Kandī; also known as Moḩammad Taqī) is a village in Angut-e Sharqi Rural District, Anguti District, Germi County, Ardabil Province, Iran. At the 2006 census, its population was 671, in 151 families.

References 

Towns and villages in Germi County